Hypnos is an independent record label, located in Portland, Oregon, United States. It was started in 1996 by M. Griffin to release his own recordings, both solo and for his collaborative project Viridian Sun, and has since become an established  ambient label.

The music released tends toward more minimal, dark ambient or drone styles, mostly electronic in basis, though ambient works based upon guitar, tuba, cello, and location recordings have also been released by Hypnos.

Their first release was the CD Washed in Mercury by Saul Stokes in 1997. As of 2011, more than 100 CDs have been released by Hypnos and its sub-labels.

Side labels 
Griffin has also started several side-labels with collaborators to focus on other genres of music.  These include the Binary and Hypnos Secret Sounds sub-labels.

Hypnos releases
 Saul Stokes - Washed in Mercury CD (hyp1602)
 M. Griffin - Sudden Dark CD (hyp1701) 
 Viridian Sun - Solar Noise CD (hyp1703)
 Various - The Other World 2xCD (hyp1804)
 David Tollefson - New Eyes on the Universe CD (hyp1805)
 Saul Stokes - Zo Pilots CD (hyp1807)
 Richard Bone - Spectral Ships CD (hyp1808)
 Jeff Greinke - Places of Motility CD (hyp1809)
 Modell/Mantra - Sonic Continuum CD (hyp1811)
 Viridian Sun - Perihelion CD (hyp1910)
 Various - Weightless, Effortless CD (hyp1912)
 Vidna Obmana - Landscape in Obscurity CD (hyp1914)
 Robert Rich - Inner Landscapes (hyp1915)
 Jeff Greinke - Lost Terrain CD (hyp1916)
 Richard Bone - Ether Dome CD (hyp1917)
 A Produce / M. Griffin - Altara CD (hyp1918)
 David Tollefson - Near and Far CD (hyp1919)
 Robert Rich - Humidity 3xCD (hyp2020)
 Jeff Pearce - To the Shores of Heaven CD (hyp2022)
 Saul Stokes - Outfolding CD (hyp2023)
 James Johnson - Entering Twilight CD (hyp2024)
 M. Griffin / Dave Fulton - The Most Distant Point Known CD (hyp2025)
 Robert Rich - Sunyata CD (hyp2026)
 Vidna Obmana - The Contemporary Nocturne CD (hyp2027)
 Markus Reuter - Digitalis CD (hyp2128)
 A Produce - Smile on the Void CD (hyp2129)
 Sola Translatio - Mother Sunrise CD (hyp2130)
 Robert Rich - Somnium DVD (hyp2131)
 Jeff Pearce - The Light Beyond CD(hyp2132)
 Vidna Obmana - Soundtrack for Aquarium 2xCD (hyp2133)
 Paul Vnuk Jr. - Silence Speaks in Shadows CD (hyp2134)
 Tom Heasley - Where the Earth Meets the Sky CD (hyp2135)
 Ma Ja Le / James Johnson - Seed CD (hyp2138)
 Oöphoi - Athlit CD (hyp2236)
 James Johnson - The Butterfly Chamber CD (hyp2237)
 Vidna Obmana - An Opera for Four Fusion Works, Act 1 CD (hyp2239)
 Vidna Obmana - An Opera for Four Fusion Works, Act 2 CD (hyp2239b)
 Vidna Obmana - An Opera for Four Fusion Works, Act 3 CD (hyp2239c)
 Vidna Obmana - An Opera for Four Fusion Works, Act 4 CD (hyp2239d)
 Jeff Greinke - Wide View CD (hyp2240)
 Jeff Pearce - Bleed CD (hyp2241)
 M. Griffin / Dave Fulton - Imprint CD (hyp2242)
 Numina - Sanctuary of Dreams CD (hyp2445)
 Chad Hoefler - Twilight in the Offing CD (hyp2446)
 Robert Scott Thompson - At the Still Point of the Turning World CD (hyp2547)
 Numina - Eye of the Nautilus CD (hyp2548)
 Paul Vnuk Jr. / Oöphoi - Distance to Zero CD (hyp2649)
 Numina - Shift to the Ghost CD (hyp2650)
 Various - Sounds of a Universe Overheard CD (hyp2752)
 Austere - Solyaris CD (hyp2753, 2009)
 Various - Message from a Subatomic World CD (hyp2854)

Hypnos Secret Sounds releases
 M. Griffin - Sounds are Hidden Inside Objects CD (hss01)
 Viridian Sun - Live Paris Theater CD (hss02)
 Stephen Philips - Dagboken CD (hss03)
 M. Griffin - I Am Breathing Dreams Out of the Air CD (hss04)
 M. Griffin - The Pulse Meditations CD (hss05)
 M. Griffin - Speaking from the Dream CDS (hss07)
 Austere - Pulse CD (hss10)
 Darren Rogers - The Alternate Realms CD (hss11)
 Justin Vanderberg - In Waking Moments CD (hss12)
 Deepspace - The Glittering Domain CD (hss25)

Binary releases
 Dweller at the Threshold - Ouroborus (HYBY0101)
 Paul Ellis - Into the Liquid Unknown (HYBY0102)
 Vir Unis/Saul Stokes - Thermal Transfer (HYBY0203)
 Synthetic Block - Sonic Approach (HYBY0204)
 Saul Stokes - Fields (HYBY0205)
 John Duval - Hell's Canyon (HYBY0306)

Current artists 
 A Produce
 Alio Die
 Austere
 Ben Fleury-Steiner
 Birds of Tin
 Chad Hoefler
 Dave Fulton
 David Tollefson
 Deepspace
 James Johnson
 Jeff Greinke
 Jeff Pearce
 Justin Vanderberg
 M. Griffin
 Ma Ja Le
 Markus Reuter
 Mystified 
 Nebulæ
 Numina
 Oöphoi
 Paul Vnuk Jr.
 Richard Bone
 Robert Rich
 Robert Scott Thompson
 Rod Modell & Michael Mantra
 Sans Serif (Forrest Fang) 
 Saul Stokes
 Sola Translatio (Alio Die & Opium)
 Stephen Philips
 Steve Brand
 Tom Heasley
 Vidna Obmana
 Vir Unis
 Viridian Sun

See also 
 List of record labels

Notes

External links
 Official site
 Hypnos on myspace.com

American independent record labels
Record labels established in 1996
Ambient music record labels
Electronic music record labels
Oregon record labels
Companies based in Portland, Oregon
Privately held companies based in Oregon
1996 establishments in Oregon